Al-Daur District (also spelled Ad-Dawr) is a district of Saladin Governorate, Iraq.

Districts of Saladin Governorate